Cossmannica is a genus of sea snails, marine gastropod mollusks in the family Pyramidellidae, the pyrams and their allies.

Description
The surface of the shell is polished, marked by faint lines of growth and microscopic spiral striations. The shell is not umbilicated. The basal fasciole is absent. The aperture is suboval. There are two columellar folds.

Species
There are nine known species within the genus Cossmannica, these include the following:
 Cossmannica aciculata A. Adams, 1855
 Cossmannica bancoensis Saurin, 1959
 Cossmannica behainei Saurin, 1959
 Cossmannica catinati Saurin, 1959
 Cossmannica champaensis Saurin, 1959
 Cossmannica discreta Saurin, 1959
 Cossmannica exesa Laseron, 1959
 Cossmannica jacksonensis (Dall & Bartsch, 1906)
 Cossmannica subcarina Laseron, 1959

References

External links
 To World Register of Marine Species

Pyramidellidae